Konstantin Malkov is an American mathematician and businessman, Chief Technology Officer and Director of 5nine Software company (http://www.5nine.com). His works are in the area of mathematical modelling; non-linear differential equations, learning machines, network security and mathematical methods in economics.

Malkov is a co-founder of the Department of Non-linear Dynamic Analysis and the I&C Laboratory at Moscow State University. Malkov has managed and overseen dozens of commercial projects in secure messaging, control, workflow, data mining, virtualization, network security, business analytics and mathematical modeling in the US, Europe and Russia.

He has authored more than 50 scientific articles on differential equations, numerical analysis, control theory, seismological inverse problems, mathematical methods in economics, and artificial intelligence. He is a former Professor of Applied Mathematics and Computer Science at Moscow State University. He received Ph.D.s in Mathematics and Computer Science in 1986 and a Doctor of Science in 1990 from that institution. He is listed in Marquis's Who is Who in the World, won a USSR Young Scientists Prize in Mathematics in 1989, and has been a member of the IEEE since 1999.

External links
Commercial Software Projects
Recent Events
Recent Publications
Listing

Russian mathematicians
American computer businesspeople
Living people
Academic staff of Moscow State University
Chief technology officers
Year of birth missing (living people)